Steven Douglas Talley (born August 12, 1981) is an American actor who grew up in Avon, Indiana. He is best known for his portrayal of Dwight Stifler in American Pie Presents: The Naked Mile  and American Pie Presents: Beta House.

Career
Talley's on-screen career began in 2002, with a minor part in the daytime soap opera As the World Turns. He appeared in three episodes of the drama series Summerland between June and July 2005 as Bryce. The following year, Talley made a guest appearance in the drama film Peaceful Warrior and on the sitcom Twins.

In the same year, Talley portrayed Dwight Stifler in American Pie Presents: The Naked Mile, the fifth installment in the American Pie film series. Released directly to video, the film earned over US$27 million worldwide. Scott Weinberg of DVD Talk wrote that Talley as Stifler "makes for one of the least appealing movie characters I've ever seen." The following year, Talley again starred as Stifler in American Pie Presents: Beta House, the sixth installment in the series. Released directly to video, the film earned over US$18 million worldwide.

Talley was featured in Van Wilder: Freshman Year as the character Dirk Arnold and also starred as Eric P. Keller in the 2010 direct-to-DVD film Hole in One, which had various names prior to release. Recently Talley has moved on to less juvenile movies, landing the lead role of investigative reporter Matt Harper in Deadline, about the racially motivated murder of an African-American youth in the South. As well as film credits, Talley has also featured in a British television commercial for Pepsi Max. During Super Bowl XLIV, he drove a car in a Bridgestone commercial about a crazy bachelor party gone wrong. Talley is also featured in a 2010 Pizza Hut ad campaign. It was announced in late June 2012 that he would play Ella Montgomery's (Holly Marie Combs) love interest on Pretty Little Liars. In 2014 he landed bigger recurring roles on two critically acclaimed TV shows: VH1's 90s nostalgia dramedy Hindsight and The CW's post-apocalyptic drama The 100. Showrunner Jason Rothenberg and writer Kim Shumway liked what Talley did with the character, the engineer Kyle Wick, so much that they developed a bigger story arc for him in season 2.

Filmography

Film

Television

References

External links

1981 births
21st-century American male actors
American male film actors
American male television actors
Living people
Male actors from Indianapolis
People from Avon, Indiana